The Helsinki Metro is a metro system in Helsinki, Finland. It was opened on 2 August 1982 and remains the only metro system in Finland and the furthest north in the world. It is operated by Helsinki City Transport (HKL) for Helsinki Regional Transport Authority (HSL) and carries over 60 million passengers per year (62.8 million in 2017).

Every other station is on the surface or elevated. The Länsimetro extension continues the line into western Helsinki and the neighbouring municipality of Espoo. The system has two depots, located in Roihupelto, Helsinki and Sammalvuori, Espoo.

Current metro line 

These are the stations on the current metro line. The names are listed first in Finnish, then in Swedish (and English, if applicable). Bus transfers are not listed.

Tram lines as of 3 May 2021. References:

Planned expansions 
These are lines that have been proposed or are undergoing planning. Existing metro stations are shown in bold.

Itämetro 

An eastern extension is currently being planned, with construction being slated to start in the early 2030s. The currently prevailing proposal extends the metro eastwards from the current terminus at Mellunmäki, with proposed stations in Länsisalmi in Vantaa and Salmenkallio, Östersundom and Sakarinmäki in Helsinki, terminating at Majvik in Sipoo. Four of the stations would be underground. Other possible stations include Vantaa's Länsimäki and Helsinki's Gumböle. The municipality of Sipoo has also explored other routes and possible further extensions, to Sibbesborg and Eriksnäs.

Other proposed lines 

Santahamina - Airport (the second metro line)
 Santahamina (Sandhamn)
 Gunillantie (Gunillavägen)
 Laajasalo (Degerö)
 Kruunuvuorenranta (Kronbergsstranden)
 Katajanokka (Skatudden)
 Kauppatori (Salutorget)
 Esplanadi (Esplanaden)
 Kamppi (Kampen)
 Töölö (Tölö)
 Olympic Stadium (Olympiastadion)
 Meilahti (Mejlans)
 Pasila (Böle)
 Olympiakylä (Olympiabyn)
 Metsälä (Krämertskog)
 Maunula (Månsas)
 Pakila (Baggböle)
 Paloheinä (Svedängen)
 Tammisto (Rosendal)
 Kartanonkoski (Herrgårdsforsen)
 Vantaanportti (Vandaport)
 Aviapolis
 Airport (Lentokenttä / Flygstation)

Pasila - Viikki (a branch of the second line)
 Pasila (Böle)
 Kumpula (Gumtäkt)
 Vanhakaupunki (Gammelstaden)
 Viikki (Vik)

Munkkivuori 

A tunnel for the first metro station in Helsinki was dug in 1964 under Munkkivuori shopping center in concordance with the city's first light rail-based metro plans. No metro line has ever reached this unfinished station, consisting of  dug in bedrock. There are no plans of connecting the station to the existing network. The tunnel was flooded due to a water pipe breakage in January 2010, two months after a similar incident at the Rautatientori station.

Notes 
  The three stations on the Helsinki Metro that have an English name that is different from its Finnish name are Central Railway Station (Rautatientori), University of Helsinki (Helsingin yliopisto), and Aalto University (Aalto-yliopisto).

References

External links 

 HKL Metro pages
 The Länsimetro project

Helsinki metro stations
 
Metro stations
Helsinki metro stations
Metro stations